Thomas Jack King  (born 8 February 1973) is an Australian sailor and Olympic champion. He won a gold medal in the 470 Class with Mark Turnbull at the 2000 Summer Olympics in Sydney. He and Turnbull were inducted into the Australian Sailing Hall of Fame in 2022.

Leadership
In January 2015 Tom King and Jessica Watson were ambassadors for the Australia Day regatta series at South Gippsland Yacht Club in Inverloch where King first began his sailing.

References

External links

1973 births
Living people
Australian male sailors (sport)
Sailors at the 1996 Summer Olympics – 470
Sailors at the 2000 Summer Olympics – 470
Olympic sailors of Australia
Olympic gold medalists for Australia
Olympic medalists in sailing
470 class world champions
World champions in sailing for Australia
Medalists at the 2000 Summer Olympics
Recipients of the Medal of the Order of Australia
21st-century Australian people